Clerkship may refer to:

Law
 Law clerk - a law student or recent law graduate who practices law under the guidance of a judge or licensed attorney. 
 a clerk of court

Medicine
 Clinical clerkship - a period of medical education in which students (medical, nursing, dental, or otherwise)– practice medicine under the supervision of a health practitioner.
 Clerkship (medicine) - clinical training for physicians in training during the second half of medical school